The Robbins Reef Light Station is a sparkplug lighthouse located off Constable Hook in Bayonne, Hudson County, New Jersey, United States, along the west side of Main Channel, Upper New York Bay. The tower and integral keepers quarters were built in 1883. It replaced an octagonal granite tower built in 1839. The U.S. Coast Guard owned and operated the light station until the 2000s.

Position 
The light is located on a small ridge of sand named Robyn's Rift by the Dutch settlers of the area. The reef is now called Robbins Reef. It is situated near the entrance to the Kill van Kull, a strait connecting New York Bay to Newark Bay. The channel is one of the most heavily used in the Port of New York and New Jersey, accessing Port Newark-Elizabeth Marine Terminal.

History 
The name derives from the New Netherland era of the 17th century. In Dutch rob or robyn means seal, groups of which would sometimes lie on the reef at low tide. The structure is also called Kate's Light for Kate Walker who "manned" the station alone after the death of her husband Captain John Walker in 1886, until 1919. She rowed her children to school in Bayonne. Herman Westgate was the last keeper of the lighthouse before it was finally automated. In 2009 Robbins Reef was put up for sale under the National Historic Lighthouse Preservation Act. In 2011, the Noble Maritime Collection, a maritime museum on Staten Island, was granted stewardship of the light station by the U.S. General Services Administration. The octagonal structure near Robbins Reef Lighthouse is not the base of the original 1839 tower but rather a sewer outfall that was constructed around 1915.

Recent developments 
In 2011, ownership was transferred to the Noble Maritime Collection based at Sailors' Snug Harbor in Staten Island, through the terms of the National Historic Lighthouse Preservation Act. Recently museum volunteers have been restoring the lighthouse, with the interior restoration nearly complete. Miller’s Launch, a local launch tug, and spill response team provides periodic transportation for the volunteers. Total renovations are expected to be complete in the early 2020s, at which time the lighthouse will offer tours and even serve as a bed and breakfast.

See also
 National Register of Historic Places listings in Hudson County, New Jersey
 Geography of New York-New Jersey Harbor Estuary

References

External links 

Noble Maritime Collection virtual tour of Robbins Reef Light Station
 Robbins Reef Data for station ID 8530973, Physical Oceanographic Real-Time System NOAA.
Robbins Reef Light  in NPS.
Kate Walker, Keeper of Robbins Reef Light, 1894–1919, National Lighthouse Museum, 2001.
Robbins Reef Lighthouse Lighthouses of the New Jersey Shore.
Mind the Light, Katie: The History of Thirty-three Female lighthouse Keepers, Mary Louise Clifford and J. Candace Clifford, 2006.
"3 Poems (from Robbins Reef Light)", Joel Lewis, Jacket Magazine 23, August, 2003.
Navesink Lighthouse and Robbins Reef Lighthouse: Lighting the Way Through New York Bay, a National Park Service Teaching with Historic Places (TwHP) lesson plan

Lighthouses completed in 1883
Bayonne, New Jersey
Lighthouses on the National Register of Historic Places in New Jersey
Transportation buildings and structures in Hudson County, New Jersey
National Register of Historic Places in Hudson County, New Jersey
1883 establishments in New Jersey